Lemsford is an unincorporated hamlet in Clinworth Rural Municipality No. 230, Saskatchewan, Canada. It previously held the status of village until January 1, 1951. The hamlet is located 42 km east of the Town of Leader at the intersection of Highway 32 and Highway 649, the hamlet is also serviced by the Great Western Railway.

History
Prior to January 1, 1951, Lemsford was incorporated as a village, and was restructured as a hamlet under the jurisdiction of the Rural municipality of Clinworth on that date.

Infrastructure

 Lemsford Ferry, located 21 km north of Lemsford on highway 649.
 Great Western Railway, a Canadian short line railway company operating on former Canadian Pacific Railway trackage in southwest Saskatchewan.

See also

 List of communities in Saskatchewan
 Hamlets of Saskatchewan

References

Clinworth No. 230, Saskatchewan
Former villages in Saskatchewan
Unincorporated communities in Saskatchewan
Ghost towns in Saskatchewan